Ancherythroculter wangi is a species of cyprinid in the genus Ancherythroculter. It lives in the upper Changjiang River in China.

Named in honor of Mr. F. T. Wang (no other information given), who collected the type specimen.

References

Cyprinidae
Taxa named by Tchang Tchung-Lin
Freshwater fish of China